Stigmella myrtillella is a moth of the family Nepticulidae. It is found from Fennoscandia and northern Russia to the Pyrenees, Italy and Bulgaria, and from Ireland to Ukraine.

The wingspan is 5,4-6,3 mm. The head is ferruginous-yellowish, collar paler. Antennal eyecaps whitish. Forewings dark fuscous, faintly purple-tinged ; a rather oblique somewhat shining whitish fascia beyond middle; outer half of cilia ochreous-white. Hindwings light grey.

Adults are on wing in May and June.

The larvae feed on Vaccinium myrtillus and Vaccinium uliginosum. They mine the leaves of their host plant. The mine consists of a contorted gallery and often a secondary blotch. The frass is concentrated in a thick central line. Pupation takes place outside of the mine.

References

External links
Fauna Europaea
bladmineerders.nl
Swedish moths
Stigmella myrtillella images at  Consortium for the Barcode of Life

Nepticulidae
Moths of Europe
Moths described in 1857